Brahmachari is a 1968 Indian film. Written by Sachin Bhowmick, it is a G. P. and Ramesh Sippy production directed by Bhappi Sonie. The film stars Shammi Kapoor, Rajshree, Pran, Mumtaz, Jagdeep, Sachin and Asit Sen. The music was by Shankar Jaikishan. The film became a box office Super Hit  and won several awards, including Filmfare Best Movie Award.

It was later remade in Tamil as Enga Mama (1970) and in Telugu as Devudu Mamayya (1981). The film's main thème was also an inspiration for the 1987 film Mr. India.

Plot 
Brahmachari (Shammi Kapoor), an orphan with no identity, takes care of many orphans in his home. Being poor, it is hard for him to take care of their every need.

One day he saves a young woman Sheetal (Rajshree) from committing suicide. She's in love with Ravi Khanna (Pran) who is promiscuous. Brahmachari promises to unite her with Ravi in return for money. Day and night he works on her appearance to make Ravi like her, but Brahmachari falls in love with her along the way. When Ravi proposes to Sheetal, she realises she loves Brahmachari. Ravi, however, brings in pressure on Brahmachari in terms of forfeiture of the mortgage on Brahmachari's house, due to non-repayment of loans.  Ravi convinces Brahmachari into giving up Sheetal by promising to repay the mortgage dues in exchange, to which Brahmachari reluctantly agrees. In order to convince Sheetal, Brahmachari pretends to be romantically involved with Rupa.  However, when Rupa tries to leave her newborn child at Brahmachari's house, Brahmachari finds out that the child's father is Ravi.  He also gets hold of love letters written by Ravi to Rupa, which he intends to use to convince Ravi to marry Rupa.  Ravi however doesn't relent and instead orders the kidnapping of Brahmachari's orphans.  A fight ensues and the children are rescued.  A repentant Ravi apologizes to Brahmachari and agrees to marry Rupa.  Brahmachari and Sheetal get married and along with the children, set off on a road trip in Brahmachari's car.

Cast
 Shammi Kapoor as Brahmchari
 Rajshree as Sheetal Chaudhary
 Mumtaz as Roopa Sharma
 Pran as Ravi Khanna
 Jagdeep as Murli Manohar
 Mohan Choti as Choti
 Dhumal as Kirtandas
 Manmohan as Basant
Baby Farida as Chandni
 Mehmood Junior
 Sachin
 Asit Sen

Soundtrack

Music scholar and film expert Rajesh Subramanian opines that the song "Aajkal Tere Mere Pyar Ke Charche" was a rejected tune, which a depressed Jaikishan played to Shammi Kapoor at Hotel Gaylord. Kapoor found the tune very catchy and suggested to director Bhappi Sonie to include the song in Brahmachari. The song became one of the highlights of the film. Also the song  "Aajkal Tere Mere Pyaar Ke Charche" , is usually thought to be sung by Lata Mangeshkar, but it was in fact sung by Suman Kalyanpur. (The confusion results from the fact that the quality of Suman Kalyanpur's voice is similar to Lata Mangeshkar's at times).

Awards and nominations

 16th Filmfare Awards:

Won

 Best Film – G. P. Sippy
 Best Actor – Shammi Kapoor
 Best Music Director – Shankar–Jaikishan
 Best Lyricist – Shailendra for "Main Gaoon Tum"
 Best Male Playback Singer – Mohammad Rafi for "Dil Ke Jharonkhe Mein"
 Best Story – Sachin Bhowmick

Nominated

 Best Director – Bhappi Sonie
 Best Lyricist – Hasrat Jaipuri for "Dil Ke Jharonkhe Mein"
 Best Male Playback Singer – Mohammad Rafi for "Main Gaoon Tum"

Other Awards:

1969 BFJA Award for Best Supporting Actress (Hindi Section) — Mumtaz
1969 BFJA Award for Best Music Director (Hindi Section) — Shankar Jaikishan
1969 BFJA Award for Best Editor (Hindi Section) — M. S. Shinde
1968 Filmfare Nomination for Best Director — Bhappi Sonie
1968 Filmfare Nomination for Best Male Playback Singer — Mohd. Rafi for the song "Main Gaoon Tum So Jao"
1968 Filmfare Nomination for Best Lyricist — Hasrat Jaipuri for the song "Dil Ke Jharoke Mein"

References

External links

1968 films
1960s Hindi-language films
Films scored by Shankar–Jaikishan
Hindi films remade in other languages
Films directed by Bhappi Sonie